Pentti Tapio Akseli Linnosvuo (17 March 1933 – 13 July 2010) was a Finnish sport shooter. Together with Alfred Lane, he is the only Olympic competitor to win gold medals in both 50 m pistol and 25 m rapid fire pistol – the technique differs much between these two events, and hence few modern top-level shooters attempt to excel in both. He competed at five consecutive Olympics in 1952–1968, winning two gold medals and a silver.

Linnosvuo was born in Vaasa, but grew up in Helsinki, where he played ice hockey with Helsingin Jalkapalloklubi, and basketball and football with Sudet. He took up shooting aged 15, first with a rifle, but then changed to pistol, which was easier to handle for a left-handed person. In 1951 he won his first national title, and at the 1952 Olympics placed fifth in the 25 m rapid fire event. He later won 15 more national titles in 1952–1967 and served as the Finnish flag bearer at the 1968 Olympics. He took part in five world championships, but medalled only in his first one in 1954. 

While competing, in 1957–65 Linnosvuo was employed by S Group, a Finnish retailing organization. After that he worked with M-real Corporation, a Finnish pulp and paper company, and coached Finnish, West German, Swiss and Norwegian national pistol teams. From 1983 to 1999 he served as president of the Finnish Hunting Association and in 1995–98 headed the Finnish Olympic Winners Association.

References

1933 births
2010 deaths
Sportspeople from Vaasa
Finnish male sport shooters
Olympic shooters of Finland
ISSF pistol shooters
Shooters at the 1952 Summer Olympics
Shooters at the 1956 Summer Olympics
Shooters at the 1960 Summer Olympics
Shooters at the 1964 Summer Olympics
Shooters at the 1968 Summer Olympics
Olympic gold medalists for Finland
Olympic silver medalists for Finland
Olympic medalists in shooting
Medalists at the 1956 Summer Olympics
Medalists at the 1960 Summer Olympics
Medalists at the 1964 Summer Olympics
20th-century Finnish people